FK506-binding protein 9 is a protein that in humans is encoded by the FKBP9 gene.

References

Further reading

EC 5.2.1
EF-hand-containing proteins